Nekrošius is a Lithuanian surname. Notable people with the surname include:

 Eimuntas Nekrošius (1952–2018), Lithuanian theatre director
 Vytautas Nekrošius (born 1970), Lithuanian  legal scholar and professor

Lithuanian-language surnames
Surnames of Lithuanian origin